The 1944 Lafayette Leopards football team was an American football team that represented Lafayette College in the Middle Three Conference during the 1944 college football season. In its second  season under head coach Ben Wolfson, the team compiled a 6–1 record and won the Middle Three championship. Edward Podgorski was the team captain. The team played its home games at Fisher Field in Easton, Pennsylvania.

Schedule

References

Lafayette
Lafayette Leopards football seasons
Lafayette Leopards football